Sir Henry Hastings (died 1629) was an English politician who sat in the House of Commons at various times between 1601 and 1626.

There were two contemporaneous individuals called Henry Hastings in Leicestershire that could have been this MP. The more likely is considered to be the son of Sir Edward Hastings of Leicester Abbey. The alternative is the son of  Walter Hastings of Braunston. One of these (probably the subject of the article) attended Emmanuel College, Cambridge and the other Lincoln College, Oxford. Both individuals were knighted in 1603 and lived near Leicester.

In 1601, Hastings was elected Member of Parliament for Leicestershire and was re-elected MP for Leicestershire in 1621, 1624 and 1626. He was a J.P. by 1606 and was appointed High Sheriff of Leicestershire for 1607–08.

Hastings married Mabel Faunt, daughter of Anthony Faunt of Foston, Leicestershire and had four sons and three daughters.

References

Year of birth missing
1629 deaths
16th-century births
Alumni of Emmanuel College, Cambridge
Henry
Members of the Parliament of England for Leicestershire
English MPs 1601
English MPs 1621–1622
English MPs 1624–1625
English MPs 1626
High Sheriffs of Leicestershire